Nebria elbursiaca is a species of ground beetle in the Nebriinae subfamily that is endemic to Iran.

Subspecies
The species have 2 subspecies all of which are endemic to Iran:
Nebria elbursiaca bagrovdaghensis Shilenkov, 1983
Nebria elbursiaca elbursiaca B. Bodemeyer, 1927

References

elbursiaca
Beetles described in 1927
Beetles of Asia
Endemic fauna of Iran